SonicEnergy (previously uBeam) is a U.S. company that claims to be developing a wireless charging system to work via ultrasound. Scientists have criticised the plausibility of this proposal.

History
SonicEnergy was founded in 2011 by Meredith Perry. SonicEnergy won University of Pennsylvania's invention competition, PennVention, in April 2011, and demonstrated the first prototype of the technology at The Wall Street Journal'''s All Things Digital Conference, D9, in May 2011.

SonicEnergy received $26 million in investment from venture capitalists and investors including Andreessen Horowitz, Upfront Ventures, Founders Fund as well as billionaire Mark Cuban and former Yahoo! Inc. Chief Executive Marissa Mayer.

By 2016, all of SonicEnergy's original engineering team had left the company, with some engineers leaving before their stocks had vested.

Axios reported that SonicEnergy privately demonstrated a working prototype of the technology at the Upfront Summit on February 2, 2017.  SonicEnergy publicly demonstrated wirelessly charging several iPhone 7s, Samsung Galaxy S7s, and LEDs simultaneously to USA Today''.

In September 2018, Meredith Perry stepped down from her role as CEO as the company changed to a business-to-business model. She was replaced by Jacqueline McCauley. In January 2019, McCauley was replaced by Simon McElrea as CEO; in December of the same year, Will Kain replaced McElrea as acting CEO. In the same announcement, the name of the company was changed from uBeam to SonicEnergy. Will Kain stepped down as CEO in May 2021.

Technology
In November 2015, the company released technical specifications for its proposed system. SonicEnergy's system would transmit ultrasound at frequencies between 45 kHz and 75 kHz, with a sound intensity of 145 dB to 155 dB SPL, and it would use a phased array technique to direct the beam.

Polarised beam polymer speakers  can direct sound energy within the specified physical structure.

Reception
Some observers have been critical of the company's ultrasound technology, stating that SonicEnergy's claims are unlikely to be achievable.  Critics have also cited problems such as the difficulty of achieving high efficiency in sound transfer, achieving an unobstructed path for the beam, and the high absorption of high frequency ultrasound in air.

Australian electrical engineer and blogger Dave Jones has been a frequent critic of SonicEnergy, stating it "will NEVER be a practical solution", and has offered detailed explanations on why "it will never work."

In 2016, former uBeam engineering VP Paul Reynolds wrote a series of blog posts stating that uBeam’s technology did not work, saying that "While in theory [uBeam] may be possible in limited cases, the safety, efficiency, and economics of it mean it is not even remotely practical." According to some former uBeam engineers, the technology would at best be able to supply a "trickle charge" to a cell phone, transmitting a few watts of power over one or two meters.

Ultrasound safety 
Ultrasound energy has the potential to produce biological effects on the body. Ultrasound waves can heat the tissues slightly. In some cases, it can also produce small pockets of gas in body fluids or tissues (cavitation).  The dose response relation between occupational exposure to very high frequency noise and resultant hearing risk is unknown.

The company claims that the beam will cut out automatically if it is intercepted by objects other than the receiver.

References

External links
 https://sonicenergy.com (usurped site)

Wireless energy transfer
Ultrasound